Vico Mossa (Serramanna, October 15, 1914 – Sassari, March 23, 2003) was an Italian architect and writer. He is best known for his buildings in Sassari, notably the restoration of the Teatro Civico, Palazzo Bosazza, Hotel Turritana, Palazzo dell'Upim, Chiesa di San Vincenzo, and Collegio Marianum on the Piazza Duomo. He was the author of many works on local and Sardinian architecture.

Publications 
 Vico Mossa, Novecento, stile sardo e così via : problemi di architettura in Sardegna. Sassari, Il Rosello, 1946
 Vico Mossa, Architettura religiosa minore in Sardegna. Sassari, Tipografia Gallizzi, 1953
 Vico Mossa, L'istituto statale d'arte per la Sardegna, Sassari. Felice Le Monnier, 1954
 Vico Mossa, Architettura domestica in Sardegna : contributo per una storia della casa mediterranea. Cagliari, La Zattera, 1957 e Sassari, Carlo Delfino, 1985
 Vico Mossa, Dai nuraghi alla rinascita. Sassari, Tipografia Gallizzi, 1961
 Vico Mossa, Architettura quotidiana. Sassari, Edizioni di Ichnusa, 1961
 Vico Mossa, I cabilli. Cagliari, La Zattera, 1965
 Vico Mossa, Architetture sassaresi. Sassari, Tipografia Gallizzi, 1965 e Sassari, Carlo Delfino Editore, 1988
 Vico Mossa, Almanacco di Sardegna. Sassari, Dessì, 1973
 Vico Mossa, Natura e civiltà in Sardegna: guida in cento schede ai beni ambientali e culturali. Sassari, Tipografia Chiarella, 1979
 Vico Mossa, Architettura e paesaggio in Sardegna. Sassari, Carlo Delfino Editore, 1981
 Vico Mossa, Dal gotico al barocco in Sardegna. Sassari, Carlo Delfino Editore, 1982
 Vico Mossa, Artigianato sardo. Sassari, Carlo Delfino Editore, 1983
 Vico Mossa, Temi d'arte e d'ambiente in Sardegna. Sassari, Carlo Delfino Editore, 1987
 Vico Mossa, Coi maestri d'arte e di muro. Sassari, Carlo Delfino Editore, 1989
 Vico Mossa, Luna & Sole : curiosità edilizie di Sassari. Sassari, Carlo Delfino Editore, 1991
 Vico Mossa, Vicende dell'architettura in Sardegna. Sassari, Carlo Delfino Editore, 1994

References

20th-century Italian architects
1914 births
2003 deaths
People from Sassari